Capnocytophaga canimorsus is a fastidious, slow-growing, Gram-negative rod of the genus Capnocytophaga.  It is a commensal bacterium in the normal gingival flora of canine and feline species, but can cause illness in humans.  Transmission may occur through bites, licks, or even close proximity with animals.  C. canimorsus generally has low virulence in healthy individuals, but has been observed to cause severe, even grave, illness in persons with pre-existing conditions.  The pathogenesis of C. canimorsus is still largely unknown, but increased clinical diagnoses have fostered an interest in the bacillus.  Treatment with antibiotics is effective in most cases, but the most important yet basic diagnostic tool available to clinicians remains the knowledge of recent exposure to canines or felines.

History
Capnocytophaga canimorsus was first observed in 1976 by Bobo and Newton.  The pair isolated a previously unknown Gram-negative bacterium from a patient presenting with meningitis in addition to sepsis.  The patient had been previously exposed to two canine bites on two consecutive days from two different dogs.  Noting the coincidence between the timing of the bites with the onset of symptoms, Butler et al. analyzed 17 similar cases of patients presenting with either sepsis or meningitis from 1961 to 1975.  The cases had been sent to the CDC for examination due to the presence of an unknown Gram-negative bacillus isolated from infected individuals.  Butler notified the CDC of the high incidence of dog bites in connection with the infections.  The CDC could not identify the organism, so they applied the name CDC group DF-2.  DF-2 stands for dysgonic fermenter, meaning that the bacterium is a slow-growing, fermentative bacillus.  In 1989, while analyzing the properties of the unknown bacterium, Weaver et al. noted many similarities to bacteria of the genus Capnocytophaga.  Later that same year, Brenner et al. proposed the name Capnocytophaga canimorsus after examining the morphology, G+C% content, and motility of the species.

Etymology 
The name Capnocytophaga is derived from the Greek word kapnos, meaning "smoke", and given here because of its dependence on carbon dioxide for growth. It was added to distinguish this genus from the Cytophaga genus, originating from the Greek words of kytos (meaning "cell"), and phagein (meaning "eat"). The species name of canimorsus comes from the Latin words canis and morsus, meaning "dog" and "bite" respectively.

Epidemiology
In the United States, 50% of Americans will be bitten by dogs during the course of their lifetimes; 1 million Americans are bitten by dogs annually.  Cases of human infection following exposure to C. canimorsus have been observed worldwide.  Cases have been reported in the United States, Canada, Europe, Australia and S. Africa.  Symptoms may appear within 2–3 days after exposure, or up to 4 weeks later.  Middle-aged and elderly persons are at greater risk for contraction of disease; more than 60% of sufferers are 50 years of age or older.  In addition, individuals who spend a greater portion of their time with canines and felines are also at higher risk.  This includes veterinarians, breeders, pet owners, and keepers.  Having certain pre-existing medical conditions exacerbates the risk.  Chance of infection by any bacterial species after dog bites varies between 3 and 20%; for cats, it may be as high as 50%.

Morphology, culture, and isolation
C. canimorsus is a fastidious, Gram-negative, fermentative, nonspore-forming rod.  Bacilli are usually 1-3 μm in length.  After growth on agar plates, longer rods tend to have a curved shape.  The bacteria do not have flagella, but move with a gliding motion, although this can be difficult to see.  C. canimorsus requires the right medium for growth.  The bacterium cultures well on blood agar plates (heart infusion agar with 5% sheep or rabbit blood) and chocolate agar plates.  Colonies may not be visible for up to 48 hours due to slow growth.  At 18 hours, colonies are usually less than 0.5 mm in diameter, and are spotty and convex.  At 24 hours, colonies may be up to 1 mm in diameter.  After 48 hours, colonies are narrow, flat, and smooth, with spreading edges.  At this time, colonies may appear to be purple, pink, or yellow, but once they are scraped from the agar plate, they are always yellow in appearance.

Genome 
The genome of  C. canimorsus strain Cc5 consists of a single circular chromosome of 2,571,406 bp with a G+C content of 36.11%, and it encodes 2,405 open reading frames.

In animals
Members of the genus Capnocytophaga are found in the oral cavities of humans and animals.  Most of these species are not found in humans.  C. canimorsus is a commensal bacterium found in dogs and cats; it is not a member of the normal microbiota of humans.  About 26% of dogs carry these commensal bacteria in their mouths.  C. canimorsus rarely causes disease symptoms in animals.  One case of C. canimorsus isolated from a dog bite wound on a small dog's head has been reported; the bacteria were localized to the wound and the dog did not present with bacteremia.  A few cases of infection have been reported in rabbits after being bitten by dogs.  Clinical manifestations of C. canimorsus in rabbits causes a range of symptoms, including disseminated intravascular coagulation, cellular necrosis (tissue death), low blood pressure, gangrene, and kidney failure.

High-risk categories

In addition to those at higher risk of developing complications from C. canimorsus due to greater contact with felines and canines, certain pre-existing conditions place individuals in a critically high-risk category.  Among these are those who have undergone a splenectomy, alcoholics, and individuals with immunosuppression due to the use of steroids such as glucocorticoids.  Individuals with β-thalassemia and smokers are also listed as high-risk.  These individuals, like asplenics and alcoholics, have increased levels of alimentary iron in their bloodstream.  C. canimorsus requires large amounts of iron to grow, so these conditions are optimal for the bacillus.

Asplenia
Of the cases presented in literature, 33% occurred in asplenic individuals, who have decreased IgM and IgG production.  They also have delayed macrophage assembly and produce less tuftsin.  Tuftsin is responsible for the stimulation of phagocytosis, so its decrease in the presence of bacterial infection poses a problem.  A functional spleen is important for the removal of pathogens.  Because this particular pathogen seems to flourish in asplenic patients,  both IgM antibodies and tuftsin may be critical in the process of marking this bacterium for destruction by phagocytosis.  Asplenics  often have double the amount of healthy iron in their bloodstreams, and are 60 times more at risk of developing fatal clinical manifestations of the bacterium.  Individuals with asplenia often experience symptom onset within a day of exposure.  The infection rapidly progresses toward multiple organ system failures and finally death.  The mortality rate in individuals with asplenia is much higher than any other at risk-category for C. canimorsus infections.

Alcoholism
People who struggle with alcohol addiction represent around 24% of individuals presenting with C. canimorsus infections.  Alcoholism has been shown to result in decreased superoxide production in neutrophils, as well as declines in neutrophil elastase activity.  This results in an increase in predisposition to bacteremia (bacteria in the blood).  As a result, people suffering from alcoholism are more likely to suffer from the more dangerous aspects of C. canimorsus invasions.  Finally, alcoholics are associated with increased blood iron content.

Immunosuppression
Immunosuppressants are often used to treat autoimmune diseases, such as lupus.  When  individuals undergo treatment with immunosuppressants such as glucocorticoids, their bodies' defenses are lowered.  As a result, exposure to C. canimorsus is more infectious in these individuals than in healthy individuals. Immunosuppressed patients make up about 5% of individuals presenting with C. canimorsus symptoms.

Symptom onset and clinical manifestations
Symptoms appear within 1–8 days after exposure to C. canimorsus but usually present around day 2.  Symptoms range from mild, flu-like symptoms to full-blown fulminant sepsis.  Individuals often complain of any combination of: fever, vomiting, diarrhea, malaise, abdominal pain, myalgia, confusion, dyspnea, headaches, and skin rashes such as exanthema.  More severe cases of endocarditis, disseminated intravascular coagulation, and meningitis have been reported.  Prior treatment with methylprednisolone has been shown to prolong bacteremia in these infections, which enables the progression of endocarditis.

Differential diagnosis
Diagnosing infections with C. canimorsus can be difficult.  Common practice for culturing isolates is to keep agar plates for one week; sometimes, cultures of C. canimorsus are not visible at that point due to slow growth or inappropriate media.  C. canimorsus requires very specific culture media and conditions; enriched media are necessary.  C. canimorsus displays enhanced growth in high concentrations of carbon dioxide, so culturing the bacteria in candle extinction jars or carbon dioxide incubators is necessary.  To diagnose this bacillus, certain reactions may be tested.  The bacterium should test positive for catalase and oxidase, arginine dihydrolase, maltose, and lactose.  It should test negative for nitrate reduction, urease, and H2S production.  C. canimorsus can be distinguished from other Gram-negative bacteria by testing negative for inulin and sucrose.  Due to the relatively slow growth of this bacterium, diagnosis often relies upon the clinician having knowledge that the patient was previously in contact with a canine or feline.  Once aware of this, clinicians can request that agar plates be kept longer than one week to ensure proper isolation of the bacterium.  Sometimes, even these methods fail.  Cases have been noted where cultures repeatedly came up negative for C. canimorsus, only to determine its presence with 16S rRNA gene sequencing.  PCR assays of species-specific genes may also be beneficial.  For individuals presenting with meningitis, C. canimorsus can be diagnosed with a cerebrospinal fluid Gram stain.  These methods are more costly, but are the best way to ensure species-level identification.  Isolates are usually obtained from blood cultures (88% of the time) and less frequently from bite wounds.  In incidents where the patient is in full septic shock, whole blood smears may be effective.

Treatment
Immediate cleansing of wounds caused by canines and felines can be successful in keeping C. canimorsus infections at bay.  Irrigation of wounds with saline is recommended and individuals are encouraged to seek medical help for the administration of antibiotics.  Antibiotics are recommended if wounds are deep or individuals postpone seeking medical attention. Antibiotics that contain beta-lactamase inhibitors (i.e., oral Augmentin or parenteral Unasyn) cover C. canimorsus, as well as other organisms common in bites.

Penicillin G is the drug of choice, although some isolates have been found to show resistance.  C. canimorsus is susceptible to ampicillin, third-generation cephalosporins, tetracyclines, clindamycin, and chloramphenicol.  It has shown resistance to gentamicin.  Treatment is recommended for a minimum of three weeks.  Hospitalization is required in more severe infections.  For cases of sepsis, high doses of penicillin are required. Third-generation cephalosporins are often given prior to diagnosis because they cover a broad range of Gram-negative bacteria.  After diagnosis, provided the strain is not beta-lactamase-producing, medication should be switched to penicillin G. Presumably, penicillin G could be given with a beta-lactamase inhibitor combination, such as Unasyn, for patients with a beta-lactamase-producing strain.

Mortality of meningitis-related infections is much lower than mortality associated with sepsis.  Because C. canimorsus induces fulminant sepsis, earlier diagnosis is associated with greater survival.

Evasion of immune system
C. canimorsus has been observed to multiply in the presence of mouse J774.1 macrophages.  Macrophages recognize and kill pathogens by engulfing them.  They also secrete cytokines necessary to begin the immune pathway cascade.  C. canimorsus bacteria are not internalized by macrophages; in fact, macrophage monolayers break down in their presence, suggestive of a cytotoxin.  In the presence of C. canimorsus, cytokine activity is greatly downregulated, because the macrophages fail to produce TNF-α, IL-8, IL-6 and IL-1α, interferon-γ, and nitric oxide.  In addition, toll-like receptor 4 (TLR4 ) normally recognizes pathogens and begins a signalling cascade to induce production of proinflammatory cytokines via the NF-κB pathway.  In cells infected with C. canimorsus, TLR4 did not activate the signalling pathway, so did not elicit an inflammatory response by the immune system.  Because this species does not elicit a strong inflammatory response, the bacteria have ample time for replication before detection by the host immune system.  Electron micrographs of J774.1 monolayers infected with C. canimorsus have shown cells of the bacteria within the macrophage's vacuoles, surrounded by bacterial septa.  This suggests that C. canimorsus replicates intracellularly in macrophages.  C. canimorsus cells also show resistance to killing by complement and killing by polymorphonuclear leukocytes (PNMs).  C. canimorsus, when in the presence of PMNs, feeds on them by deglycosylating host glycans.  In fact, in the presence of PMNs, C. canimorsus experiences robust growth.  C. canimorsus has the ability to evade these necessary immune functions, and, therefore, must be taken seriously.  Greater knowledge about the pathogenesis of this bacterium is required to prevent and treat the diseases associated with it.

References

External links
 
 
 

Flavobacteria
Bacterial diseases
Zoonoses
Bacteria described in 1989
Cat diseases